David Bernardo Mendoza Ayala (born 10 May 1985), known as David Mendoza, is a Paraguayan football defender who currently plays for Guaireña.

External links

1985 births
Living people
Paraguayan footballers
Paraguayan expatriate footballers
Association football midfielders
Cerro Porteño players
Club Rubio Ñu footballers
Club Nacional footballers
Sportivo Trinidense footballers
Asociación Civil Deportivo Lara players
General Díaz footballers
Paraguayan Primera División players
Venezuelan Primera División players
People from San Ignacio, Paraguay
Paraguayan expatriate sportspeople in Venezuela
Expatriate footballers in Venezuela